Bliss Bay is a bay in the Wandel Sea, Northern Greenland. The area of the bay is uninhabited. Administratively Bliss Bay and its surroundings belong to the Northeast Greenland National Park.

Bliss Bay is clogged by fast ice year round. Formerly there was an automatic weather station in the bay.

The bay was named by Robert Peary after E. W. Bliss, one of the founding members of the Peary Arctic Club in New York.

Geography
It is a fairly large bay, located between Cape James Hill to the west and Cape J.P. Koch in the east. A river, Lokes Elv, discharges into the head of the bay.

Kaffeklubben Island lies to the NW off the mouth of Bliss Bay. There are also numerous skerries and small islands along the shore of the bay, as well as inside of it. The Moore Glacier, discharging from the easternmost subranges of the Roosevelt Range, has its terminus in the SE shore of the bay.

References

External links
Early to middle Holocene valley glaciations on northernmost Greenland
Greenland North Coast - Jeff Shea
North America, Greenland, The Far North, Jensenland, Explorations of Most Northerly Land
Bays of Greenland
Peary Land